O sertanejo (English: The backcountry) is a novel written by the Brazilian writer José de Alencar. It was first published in 1875.

External links
 O sertanejo, the book

1875 Brazilian novels
Novels by José de Alencar
Portuguese-language novels